Forres in Elginshire was a burgh constituency that elected one commissioner to the Parliament of Scotland and to the Convention of Estates.

After the Acts of Union 1707, Forres, Fortrose, Nairn and Inverness formed the Inverness district of burghs, returning one member between them to the House of Commons of Great Britain.

List of burgh commissioners

 1661: John Layne, bailie 
 1665 convention: Francis Forbes of Thornhill 
 1667 convention: Harie Ross 
 1669–1672, 1678 convention: Patrick Tulloch of Boigton, provost 
 1681–82: Thomas Urquhart 
 1685–86: James Smith, heritor 
 1689 convention, 1689: Thomas Tulloch (declared absent) 
 1693–1702: William Brodie of Whitewreath  
 1702–07: George Brodie of Ailisk

References

See also
 List of constituencies in the Parliament of Scotland at the time of the Union

Politics of Moray
History of Moray
Constituencies of the Parliament of Scotland (to 1707)
Constituencies disestablished in 1707
1707 disestablishments in Scotland